Solveig Hedengran (26 April 1910 – 29 April 1956) was a Swedish stage and film actress. She appeared in about 30 films between 1919 and 1956.

Selected filmography

 Synnöve Solbakken (1919)
 German Women - German Faithfulness (1927)
The Poetry of Ådalen (1928)
 The Realm of the Rye (1929)
 The Österman Brothers' Virago (1932)
 Synnöve Solbakken (1934)
 Skärgårdsflirt (1935)
 Raggen (1936)
 Comrades in Uniform (1938)
 Mot nya tider (1939)
 Swing it, magistern! (1940)
 How to Tame a Real Man (1941)
 En trallande jänta (1942)
 Barnen från Frostmofjället (1945)
 Bill Bergson, Master Detective (1947)
 Love Wins Out (1949)
 Poker (1951)
 Bill Bergson and the White Rose Rescue (1953)
 All the World's Delights (1953)
 Café Lunchrasten (1954)
 The Girl in the Rain (1955)

References

Further reading

External links

1910 births
1956 deaths
20th-century Swedish actresses
Swedish film actresses
Swedish silent film actresses
Actresses from Stockholm